Black rage can refer to:

 Black Rage (book), by William H. Grier and Price M. Cobbs, 1968
 Black Rage (film), by Chris Robinson, 1972
 Black rage defense, used in the 1994 trial of murderer Colin Ferguson